Kenneth Good may refer to:

 Kenneth Good (anthropologist) (born 1942), American anthropologist
 Ken Good (Kenneth Raymond Good, born 1931), current bishop of Derry and Raphoe
 Kenneth Good (political scientist) (born 1933), Australian political scientist
 Ken Good (priest) (born 1941), English Anglican priest